Mary Ann Weinand ( Coady; December 25, 1959 – September 26, 2007) was an American psychiatrist in Tucson, Arizona for 16 years from 1991 until 2007. She was best known as an effective psychiatrist and has become a local symbol for hope in the fight against breast cancer. In May 2008 her old psychiatric clinic was renamed in her honor as a tribute to her legacy and impact in the Southern Arizona treatment of Psychiatry. It was the first time such a building was named after an employee in Tucson.

She became a local icon in Tucson in the fight against breast cancer, which claimed her own life. She was the first woman psychiatrist to have a building name after her honor as a result of her legacy. More than $10,000 has been donated to local charities in her memory. She was featured in the Life Stories section of the Arizona Daily Star on May 10, 2008

Early life and career
Mary Ann Coady was born on Christmas Day, 1959 in Homestead Air Force Base near Miami, Florida to Neil J. Coady and Dolores (née Breitenbach). She was raised in Wichita, Kansas and graduated from Kapaun Mt. Carmel High School in 1977. Her favorite activity as a teen was riding her horse. She graduated from the University of Kansas with a B.A. in Human Biology with Distinction in 1982. She had initially planned on studying to become a Nurse, but when she applied to nursing school her interviewers suggested that with her record she would be more suited for Medical School. 

She switched her path of study to pre-medicine soon after. In college, she was a member of the Phi Beta Kappa Honor Society. She went on to Medical School and completed medical school at the University of Kansas School of Medicine in 1986, and residency training in Adult Psychiatry in 1990. She was board certified in both Adult Psychiatry and Addiction Psychiatry. She practiced psychiatry in Tucson from 1991 until June 2007 when she abruptly left work at COPE Community Services due to her rapidly deteriorating health.

Death
She died on September 26, 2007, aged 47, peacefully at her Arizona home, surrounded by her family, from breast cancer. She had been with COPE since May 2001. Her battle with breast cancer enabled her to write her own obituary a week before she died. It was published in the Arizona Daily Star. In addition to her husband, Dr. Martin Edward Weinand (born October 19, 1958) and their three children, she was survived by her parents and her mother-in-law, Martha E. Bean-Weinand.

COPE Building Dedication Ceremony
Her commitment was recognized on May 10, 2008, with the dedication of the Mary Ann Coady Weinand, M.D., Clinic on East Lakeside Parkway in Tucson. The clinic, where Dr. Coady Weinand worked before succumbing to metastatic breast cancer last year, provides services to adults with serious and general mental illness and substance abuse issues.

Legacy
 Mary Ann Coady Weinand Clinic COPE Case Management Services at Weinand Clinic provides

References

1959 births
2007 deaths
21st-century American women
American women psychiatrists
American psychiatrists
20th-century American women physicians
20th-century American physicians
Deaths from breast cancer
Deaths from cancer in Arizona
University of Kansas alumni
People from Tucson, Arizona
People from Wichita, Kansas